The Roland Z-602 is a German ultralight and light-sport aircraft, produced by Roland Aircraft of Mendig. The aircraft is supplied as a kit for amateur construction or as a complete ready-to-fly-aircraft.

Design and development
The aircraft was designed to comply with the Fédération Aéronautique Internationale microlight rules and US light-sport aircraft rules. It features a cantilever low-wing, a two-seats-in-side-by-side configuration enclosed cockpit under a bubble canopy, fixed tricycle landing gear or conventional landing gear and a single engine in tractor configuration.

The aircraft is made from sheet aluminum. The standard engine available is the  Rotax 912ULS four-stroke powerplant.

The Z-602 is offered with three landing gear configurations: fixed tricycle, conventional and retractable as the RG model. It is sold with two different levels of options, the Economy and the Exclusiv. The fixed gear model can be derigged and transported by trailer in 20 minutes.

As of August 2012, the design does not appear on the Federal Aviation Administration's list of approved special light-sport aircraft.

Operational history
Reviewer Marino Boric described the design in a 2015 review as having "an elegant appearance in flight."

Specifications (Z-602 Exclusiv RG)

References

External links

2000s German ultralight aircraft
Homebuilt aircraft
Light-sport aircraft
Z-602
Single-engined tractor aircraft
Low-wing aircraft